Klaus Gerbig (6 May 1939 – 20 June 1992) was a German hurdler. He competed in the men's 110 metres hurdles at the 1960 Summer Olympics.

References

1939 births
1992 deaths
Athletes (track and field) at the 1960 Summer Olympics
German male hurdlers
Olympic athletes of the United Team of Germany
Place of birth missing